Tom Jack was a soccer player who captained the Australian national team during the 1950s.

Playing career
Jack began his professional career in Scotland, playing for Dunfermline Athletic and Third Lanark before emigrating to Australia in 1948.

On arriving in Australia, Jack played for Brighton in the Victoria State League.

He made his debut for Australia against Southern Rhodesia in Salisbury in 1950. He played 11 times for the national team between 1950 and 1955, including two matches as captain.

Coaching career
Jack was a player coach at Brighton and Box Hill.

References

Australia international soccer players
Australian soccer players
Place of birth missing
Year of birth uncertain
Association football central defenders
1971 deaths